John Don Looney (September 2, 1916 – April 5, 2015) was a professional American football end in the National Football League (NFL). He was born in Sulphur Springs, Texas. He played three seasons for the Philadelphia Eagles (1940) and the Pittsburgh Steelers (1941–1942). He was the first receiver in NFL history to have over 100 yards receiving in each of his first two games, a feat which was not equaled until the 2008 NFL season by another Eagles wide receiver, DeSean Jackson. Looney served in World War II for the United States Army after the 1942 season.

At the time of his death, Looney was the second oldest living former NFL player. He was the father of NFL running back Joe Don Looney, who died in a one-person motorcycle accident after his NFL career ended. Looney was survived by his longtime partner, Linda Roark, whom he met in 1992.

References

External links
 

1916 births
2015 deaths
American football ends
National Football League officials
Philadelphia Eagles players
Pittsburgh Steelers players
TCU Horned Frogs football players
United States Army personnel of World War II
People from Sulphur Springs, Texas
Players of American football from Texas